Minuscule 577 (in the Gregory-Aland numbering), ε 454 (in the Soden numbering), is a Greek minuscule manuscript of the New Testament, on paper. It is dated by a colophon to the year 1346.
Scrivener labelled it by 871. The manuscript has complex contents.

Description 

The codex contains the text of the four Gospels on 259 paper leaves (size ). The writing is in one column per page, 23 lines per page.

There is also a division according to the shorter Ammonian Sections (in Mark 232 sections - the last Section in 16:6), with references to the Eusebian Canons.

Text 

The Greek text of the codex is a representative of the Byzantine text-type. Hermann von Soden classified it to the textual family Kx. Aland placed it in Category V.
According to the Claremont Profile Method it represents mixed Byzantine text in Luke 1, Luke 10, and Luke 20. It is creates textual cluster with the codex 545 in Luke 1 and with codex 1519 in Luke 20.

It has some unusual readings.

History 

The manuscript was written by Gregorius, a scribe. It once belonged to Bénigne Bouhier (1635—1703) and his son Jean Bouhier (1673—1746).

Scrivener labelled it by 871.

The manuscript was examined and described by Léopold Victor Delisle.

Currently the manuscript is housed at the library of the University of Montpellier (Sect. Medecine, H. 446) in Montpellier.

See also 

 List of New Testament minuscules
 Biblical manuscript
 Textual criticism

References

Further reading 

 Léopold Victor Delisle, Le cabinet des Manuscrits, Paris, vol. 2 (1874), pp. 266–276.

Greek New Testament minuscules
14th-century biblical manuscripts